Ismael "Isma" Ruiz Sánchez (born 14 February 2001) is a Spanish professional footballer who plays as a central midfielder for UD Ibiza, on loan from Granada CF.

Club career
Born in Gójar, Granada, Andalusia, Ruiz represented CA La Zubia, Ogíjares 89 CF, UD Maracena, CD Santa Fe and Granada CF as a youth. He made his senior debut with the latter's reserves on 17 March 2019, coming on as a second-half substitute in a 0–1 Segunda División B away loss against CD Badajoz.

On 19 July 2019, Ruiz renewed his contract until 2023, being definitely promoted to the B-side. He made his first team debut on 17 December, starting in a 3–2 away success over CE L'Hospitalet, for the season's Copa del Rey.

Ruiz made his La Liga debut on 8 November 2020, starting in a 0–2 away loss against Real Sociedad, as his side was heavily impacted by the COVID-19 pandemic. He scored his first senior goal ten days later, netting the B's equalizer in a 2–2 home draw against Sevilla Atlético.

Ruiz was a member of the first team squad during the 2021–22 season, as Granada suffered relegation from the top tier. On 19 August 2022, he moved to UD Ibiza in Segunda División on a one-year loan deal.

Career statistics

Club

References

External links

2001 births
Living people
Sportspeople from the Province of Granada
Spanish footballers
Footballers from Andalusia
Association football midfielders
La Liga players
Segunda División B players
Segunda Federación players
Club Recreativo Granada players
Granada CF footballers
UD Ibiza players
Spain youth international footballers